Altoon Sultan (1948) is an American artist and author who specializes in rural landscapes painted in egg tempera.  Her works are in the collections of the Metropolitan Museum of Art, the Museum of Fine Arts, Boston, and the Yale University Art Gallery.  She has received two grants from the National Endowment for the Arts. She received her BFA in 1969 after studying painting at Brooklyn College, and her MFA in 1971, also at Brooklyn College, where she studied with Philip Pearlstein and Lois Dodd. She also attended Skowhegan School of Painting and Sculpture.

Altoon Sultan maintains a popular blog, Studio and Garden, in which she posts nature photographs of her home in Groton, Vermont, her land and garden, her thoughts about her art-making, and reviews and photographs of exhibitions she frequently visits in New York City and elsewhere. Sultan is known for her dedication to materials and color, often valuing the two over a deeper meaning to her pieces. She is also known for rejecting the large scale that minimalist art often takes, instead favoring a smaller, more intimate scale.

Exhibitions 
Sultan's art was shown at McKenzie Fine Art in New York in 2017. Her bas-relief sculptures in painted porcelain, begun in 2015, were exhibited for the first time in the show at McKenzie. Her 2007 show Monuments of Architecture at the Tibor de Nagy Gallery featured her egg-tempera paintings showing the influence of her photography.

Collections 
Sultan's art is included in the National Gallery of Australia's Kenneth Tyler Collection.

Biography 
 Altoon Sultan, The Luminous Brush: Painting With Egg Tempera, Watson Guptill Publications, New York 1999.

References

External links 
 
https://hyperallergic.com/617027/altoon-sultans-powerful-challenge/

Modern painters
Living people
American women painters
20th-century American painters
1948 births
Artists from Vermont
21st-century American women writers
National Endowment for the Arts Fellows
Brooklyn College alumni
20th-century American women photographers
20th-century American photographers
21st-century American women photographers
21st-century American photographers
Skowhegan School of Painting and Sculpture alumni